The United States House of Representatives elections in California, 1884 was an election for California's delegation to the United States House of Representatives, which occurred as part of the general election of the House of Representatives on November 4, 1884. Republicans won both newly created districts and three of the four existing districts.

Overview

Delegation composition

Results

District 1

District 2

District 3

District 4

District 5

District 6

See also
49th United States Congress
Political party strength in California
Political party strength in U.S. states
United States House of Representatives elections, 1884

References
California Elections Page
Office of the Clerk of the House of Representatives

External links
California Legislative District Maps (1911-Present)
RAND California Election Returns: District Definitions

1884
United States House of Representatives
California